Alexander Webb may refer to:
 Alexander Russell Webb (1846–1916), one of the earliest Americans to convert to Islam
 Alexander S. Webb (1835–1911), general in the American Civil War, defended the famous "Copse of Trees" during Pickett's charge at the Battle of Gettysburg, 1863
 Alexander Stewart Webb (banker) (1870–1948), American banker and philanthropist

See also
Alexander Webbe, cricketer
Alex Webb (disambiguation)